Pelagius (c. 360 to 435) was a British monk whose theology is known as Pelagianism.

Pelagius may also refer to:

Pelagius of Constance (c. 270–c. 283), Hungarian child martyr
Pope Pelagius I (died 561), reigned 556–561
Pope Pelagius II (died 590), reigned 579–590
Pelagius of Asturias (c. 685–737), first king of Asturias
Pelagius the Hermit (fl. 9th century), Spanish hermit
Pelagius of Cordova (c. 912–c. 926), Galician Christian child-martyr
Pelagius (bishop of Lugo) (died 1000)
Pelagius of Oviedo (died 1153, Spanish bishop of Oviedo
Pelagius Galvani (c. 1165–1230), or Pelagio Galvani, Spanish cardinal
Alvarus Pelagius (c. 1280–1352), Galician canonist

See also
Pelagio (disambiguation)
Pelayo (disambiguation)
Pelagianism